Early College High School is a high school in Salem, Oregon, United States that allows high school students to pursue college education early, similar to dual enrollment programs. When the students begin their junior year, they enter a phase when they are allowed to take part-time college classes. By the time the student is in their senior year, they are expected to be a full-time college student. Early College High School is located on the campus of Chemeketa Community College, building 50.

Academics
In 2008, 11% of the school's seniors received their high school diploma. Of 178 students, 19 graduated, 69 dropped out, one received a modified diploma, and 89 were still in high school the following year.

References

High schools in Salem, Oregon
Charter schools in Oregon
Early College High Schools
Public middle schools in Oregon
Public high schools in Oregon
2006 establishments in Oregon